Qaleh Kesh may refer to:
 Qaleh Kesh, Amol